Tabora is the capital of Tanzania's Tabora Region and is classified as a municipality by the Tanzanian government. It is also the administrative seat of Tabora Urban District. According to the 2012 census, the district had a population of 226,999.

History 

Beginning in the 1830s, coastal traders increasingly settled in the region to take advantage of the ivory and slave caravan trade. Swahili and Omani traders established Kazeh, near present-day Tabora, in the 1850s. By 1870, Tabora was home to a population of 5,000-10,000 people living in roughly fifty large square houses. These homes accommodated up to several hundred people each and had inner courtyards, adjacent garden plots, store rooms, servant quarters and outhouses for slaves. The town was also surrounded by Nyamwezi villages, which provided produce and caravan labor. In this period the Sultan of Zanzibar appointed a representative there. It was part of the Kingdom of Unyanyembe. Tabora was a center of trade for traders from as far North as the Buganda Kingdom. By August 1871, one-quarter of the town was burned when the forces of the Nyamwezi ruler Mirambo sacked it. Although the German East Africa protectorate was proclaimed over the region in 1885, as late as 1891 travellers reported it to be a lawless town, and the German colonial administration did not gain control of it until later that year. As a major station on the Central Line it became the most important administrative centre of central German East Africa.

In 1916 the colonial garrison had an emergency mint at Tabora, making some gold pieces as well as large numbers of crude copper and brass German East African rupie minor coins Mint marked with a "T". During the Tabora Offensive in the East African Campaign of World War I, colonial armed forces of the Belgian Congo (Force Publique) under the command of General Charles Tombeur captured the town on 19 September 1916 after 10 days and nights of heavy fighting.

Socio-economic situation 

Tabora and its people mainly rely on agricultural activities as either sustenance farmers or small-scale tobacco farmers. Tabora also hosts a ballast quarry.

Water supply is managed by the Tabora Urban Water Supply and Sanitation Authority (Tuwasa), sourced from Igombe and Kazima Dams. The Igombe River is a tributary of the Malagarasi River and the Malagarasi-Muyovozi Wetlands.

Food and culture 

Tabora's streets are lined with century-old mango trees planted by Omani traders. Tabora is known as the fruit capital of Western Tanzania, and markets are often filled with local produce.

Tabora has many small local restaurants offering typical Tanzanian restaurant food like Ugali (a thick maize porridge), chips, or rice with beans, beef or chicken. For breakfast or lunch, there is usually chipsi-mayai (chips and egg), which is basically a couple of eggs fried together with some chips. Although the food is bland, it is usually served with Tanzanian chili sauce, which gives the meal some character.

A local specialty is pumpkin in peanut butter sauce. This goes with the rice pilau served widely throughout the region.

For snacks there are local sambusa (samosa), some goat meat on a stick or some freshly roasted corn of the cob, all widely available in Tabora. There is a choice of fruit in the large regional market of Tabora, including pineapples, watermelons, and bananas.

Tourism 

Tabora does not have many tourist attractions. It is well off the beaten track, with few tourists. Of note is Fort Boma, erected at the end of the 19th century by the Germans and still in use by the military of Tanzania. Another colonial remnant is the railway station.

About 9 Miles (15 kilometres) south west of Tabora is Kwihara town, formerly known as Kazeh and an important town in the slave trade until the Germans started developing Tabora.  Kazeh's best-known visitors were David Livingstone and Sir Henry Morton Stanley, who were highly impressed by the town of Kazeh.  There is a small museum dedicated to Dr Livingstone, called "the Livingstone Museum", with entry costing 2,000 Tanzanian shillings.

Another day trip from Tabora is Igombe Dam, a local forest reserve.

Climate 
Tabora has a tropical savanna climate (Köppen Aw) with two seasons of approximately equal length. The wet season is from November to April and is followed by a dry season from May to October.

Transport 

Tabora is small enough to walk from one side of town to the other. Bicycle taxis, motorbike taxis and regular taxis are available.

Road links
Tabora at the moment is served by  mostly paved road T18 from Singida Region to Kigoma and partly unpaved  road T8 from Mbeya to Mwanza passing through the district. Salt flats to the west prevent a direct road from connecting to Kigoma.

In January 2013, the Tanzanian government announced the commencement of work to upgrade to tarmac level the Tabora-Urambo road and the  Nyahua-Tabora-Ndono road. In December 2012, Prime Minister Mizengo Pinda stated the Tanzanian government's intent to upgrade the  Tabora-Inyonga-Mpanda road to tarmac level before 2015. In August 2011, Deputy Minister for Works Harrison Mwakyembe told the National Assembly that the government had begun to tarmac the  Tabora-Puge-Nzega road.

Railway links
Tabora is served and is a junction on the Central railway line, which goes east to Dar es Salaam, west to Kigoma on to the Lake Tanganyika and north to the port of Mwanza on Lake Victoria. Trains leave three times a week in any direction.

In 2017, a new station on the standard gauge railway is proposed.

Airport
Tabora is served by the Tabora Airport which is located 7 kilometers south of the centre of town. Renovation of the airport was completed in 2015.

Precision Air started flying to the airport three times a week on Monday, Wednesday and Friday, east from Julius Nyerere International Airport Dar es Salaam and west from Kigoma.

See also 

 Railway stations in Tanzania
 Tabora Deaf-Mute Institute
 Transport in Tanzania

References

Further reading 

 Columbia Encyclopedia, Sixth Edition (at encyclopedia.com)
 Tabora Region Socio-Economic Profile, joint publication by The Planning Commission Dar es Salaam and Regional Commissioner's Office Tabora, 1998

Populated places in Tabora Region
Regional capitals in Tanzania
1850s establishments in Africa